William C. Chynoweth (August 28, 1861–November 11, 1935) was an American newspaper editor, businessman, marshal, and politician.

Chynoweth was born in Monroe County, Ohio. In 1872, he moved with his family to Macon County, Illinois. He went to the public schools and to Illinois Wesleyan University. He taught school and was involved with farming.

In 1888, Chynoweth moved to Rogers, Arkansas because of his health. While living in Rogers, Arkansas, he was an editor of a newspaper and served as postmaster. Chynoweth also served as a deputy United States Marshal. He moved back to Decatur, Illinois, in 1910, and was involved with farming, banking, and the insurance business. Chynoweth served on the Macon County Board of Supervisors and was a Republican. He served in the Illinois House of Representatives from 1925 to 1934. Chynoweth died from a kidney ailment at the Dr. George Laughlin Hospital in Kirksville, Missouri.

Notes

External links

1861 births
1935 deaths
People from Decatur, Illinois
People from Monroe County, Ohio
People from Rogers, Arkansas
Illinois Wesleyan University alumni
Businesspeople from Illinois
Educators from Illinois
Editors of Arkansas newspapers
Farmers from Illinois
County board members in Illinois
Republican Party members of the Illinois House of Representatives
Arkansas postmasters
19th-century American newspaper editors
20th-century American newspaper editors